Kevin Ademola Aladesanmi Sanchez (born 12 November 1998) is a professional footballer who plays as a midfielder for Atlético Bucaramanga, on loan from Atlético Junior. Born in Sweden to a Nigerian father and Colombian mother, he holds Colombian nationality.

Career
Aladesanmi had a spell in the system of Academia Tolimense, prior to later joining Parma de Barranquilla. In 2017, Aladesanmi joined LigaPro side Olhanense on loan. He made his professional debut against Sporting B on 2 April 2017, being substituted on for Federico Virga during a 5–1 loss. He featured six more times as Olhanense were relegated from the 2016–17 LigaPro. Aladesanmi subsequently agreed to join Colombia's Barranquilla of Categoría Primera B. Four goals in fifteen matches followed, with the midfielder scoring twice in his final appearance versus Cúcuta Deportivo in the play-offs on 12 November.

Categoría Primera A side Atlético Junior signed Aladesanmi at the beginning of the 2018 campaign. After featuring five times that year, Aladesanmi was loaned out in January 2019 to second tier team Leones. For the 2020 season, he was loaned out to Atlético Bucaramanga.

Personal life
Aladesanmi was born in Sweden to a Nigerian father and a Colombian mother; his father, Felix Ademola, was playing football for Deportes Tolima when they met. Aladesanmi's birth place of Jönköping was where his parents were holidaying at the time. He spent the first years of his life growing up in Norway, while Ademola was playing for Skeid and Haugesund. During which time his parents separated, with Aladesanmi joining his mother in Ibagué, Colombia.

Career statistics
.

References

External links

1998 births
Living people
Sportspeople from Jönköping
Colombian footballers
Swedish footballers
Colombian people of Nigerian descent
Swedish people of Nigerian descent
Swedish people of Colombian descent
Association football midfielders
Colombian expatriate footballers
Expatriate footballers in Portugal
Colombian expatriate sportspeople in Portugal
Liga Portugal 2 players
Categoría Primera B players
Categoría Primera A players
S.C. Olhanense players
Barranquilla F.C. footballers
Atlético Junior footballers
Leones F.C. footballers
Atlético Bucaramanga footballers